The 1896 North Dakota gubernatorial election was held on November 3, 1896. Republican nominee Frank A. Briggs defeated People's Party nominee Robert B. Richardson with 55.61% of the vote.

General election

Candidates
Frank A. Briggs, Republican
Robert B. Richardson, People's

Results

References

1896
North Dakota
Gubernatorial